Tuukka Kotti (born 18 March 1981) is a Finnish professional basketball player for the Helsinki Seagulls.

Kotti attended Providence College in the United States, where he played college basketball between 2001 and 2005. He left Finland as a point guard, but gradually turned into a center during his college career.

In 2018, Kotti was named the Korisliiga Most Valuable Player at age 37, while playing with Helsinki Seagulls.

References

1981 births
Living people
Andrea Costa Imola players
Centers (basketball)
Crailsheim Merlins players
Finnish expatriate basketball people in France
Finnish expatriate basketball people in Germany
Finnish expatriate basketball people in Italy
Finnish expatriate basketball people in the United States
Finnish men's basketball players
Helsinki Seagulls players
Nilan Bisons players
Nuova AMG Sebastiani Basket Rieti players
People from Forssa
Power forwards (basketball)
Providence Friars men's basketball players
Vanoli Cremona players
2014 FIBA Basketball World Cup players
Sportspeople from Kanta-Häme